Two ships of the Royal Fleet Auxiliary have borne the name RFA Oakleaf:

  was the ocean liner Montezuma, acquired by the RFA in 1915 as a dummy battleship to imitate , and named Abadol. She was renamed Oakleaf in 1917 and was sunk by a U-boat later that year.
  was a  tanker launched in 1981 as the Oktania. She was acquired by the RFA in 1986 and was retired from active service as in 2007 and later scrapped.

Royal Fleet Auxiliary ship names